Leyli Yadegar (also Romanized as Leylī Yādegār; also known as Laleh Yādegār) is a village in Solgi Rural District, Khezel District, Nahavand County, Hamadan Province, Iran. At the 2006 census, its population was 1,133, in 258 families.

References 

Populated places in Nahavand County